CBI Laboratories, Inc. is a company founded in 1982 which develops and manufactures products targeting the dermatological market.

Products
The company has its own research and development department which is responsible for formulations concentrating on skin care, sun protection, and hair care.  CBI also offers over products for private label at small order quantities targeting spas, skincare boutiques, aestheticians, and physicians offices. Stock products include bath salts, body lotions, body scrubs/sugar scrubs, body treatments/products, cleansers, eye treatments, foot care products, massage treatment, serums, shower gel/body wash, and toners, as well as over the counter pharmaceuticals.

CBI Laboratories is also a member of ICMAD (Independent Cosmetic Manufacturers and Distributors.)

External links
Microcurrent Machine
Touch Beauty Homepage
Beauty Supply Online Shop

Cosmetics companies of the United States
Skin care brands